The UBM Northern Classic was a women's professional golf tournament on the Ladies European Tour held in England. It was played 1983 and 1984 at Arcot Hall Golf Club near Newcastle upon Tyne.

Both winners, Cathy Panton and Dale Reid, secured their eighth LET title at the event, respectively.

Winners

Source:

References

External links
Ladies European Tour

Former Ladies European Tour events
Golf tournaments in England
Defunct sports competitions in England
Recurring sporting events established in 1983
Recurring sporting events disestablished in 1984